Hi-Teknology²: The Chip is a sequel album to Hip hop producer Hi-Tek's first album, Hi-Teknology. Born as Tony Cottrell, He had spent most of his time in the low key hip-hop scene of Cincinnati, Ohio who eventually ran into Mood in 1992. Working with them kickstarted his career and affiliated himself with many MCs. He is best known for his collaboration with Talib Kweli on the album Reflection Eternal. He rose in popularity with the underground hip-hop scene and has worked alongside many talented even Grammy-nominated artists such as 50 Cent and Busta Rhymes. Although working with many talented artists and having a huge impact working with Rawkus Records Collective, it was time for him to show off his own unique abilities which led to his three solo albums. The release of his sequel album Hi-Teknology gained quick recognition and was soon to be sought after by many up-and-coming artists to produce their own albums.

Album History 

There are two versions of the album; one was recorded during Tek's record deal with MCA but never saw a release, and the second version which was released by Babygrande Records on October 17, 2006. It is produced entirely by Hi-Tek and, unlike the first album, has Hi-Tek rapping on more of the tracks. A special edition version of the album was released at Best Buy, featuring the three omitted tracks and a bonus DVD, featuring the music video for "Where It Started At (NY)" and footage of Hi-Tek producing "The Chip" from scratch. It reached #38 on the Billboard 200 chart position and #12 on the R&B/Hip-Hop chart position where US sales reached 51,782.

Album Appearances 

Album guests include Pretty Ugly, Q-Tip, Kurupt, Talib Kweli, Ghostface Killah, Busta Rhymes, Jadakiss, Papoose, Raekwon, The Game, Strong Arm Steady, Bun B, Devin the Dude, Nas, Common and Marsha of Floetry .

Track Information 

The final track listing has been whittled down from 18 to 15 tracks, omitting the songs, "How We Do It", "Time Is Now", and "We Get Down".  The late producer, J Dilla, makes a cameo appearance on the song "Music For Life". The album's lead single is "Where It Started At (NY)", which features MC's Jadakiss, Papoose, Talib Kweli and Raekwon, and utilizes a sample from the Andy Williams song "(Where Do I Begin?) Love Story". The three omitted tracks ("Time Is Now", "We Get Down" & "How We Do It") were leaked on the internet on October 23, 2006. Both "Time is Now" and "How We Do It" were previously available on The Beautiful Mixtape Vol. 2. "Time is Now" was a shorter version.

Reception 

Later on, Hi-Tek blamed the label for the lack of success of the album: "Hi-Teknology 2 was a prime example of a classic album, which just went down the drain as no one heard it. That’s not my fault; that is the label’s job to make sure people heard it. I get out and do every interview and all the press, but it was more a case of when they recouped, they were cool with that and it went no further. I had nine Interscope artists on that album and the only reason I got that was because of my relationship with [Dr.] Dre and Interscope. A lot of people wouldn’t be able to get that, so why not capitalize off that relationship?"

Track listing

Additional credits
The Chip
Guitar - Josh Edmondson

Josephine
Drums - Big D
Drums [Additional] - Eric "E Dub" Isaacs
Guitar - Larry Cottrell
Keyboards - Carolyn Isaacs

March
Guitar - Glen Jeffreys
Keyboards - Daniel Jones

Let It Go
Guitar - Glen Jeffreys

People Going Down
Bass - Carolyn Isaacs
Guitar - Larry Cottrell
Keyboards - Carolyn Isaacs

Album singles

Album chart positions

References

External links 
"Where It Started At (NY)" music video
"Music For Life" audio

2006 albums
Hi-Tek albums
Albums produced by Hi-Tek
Babygrande Records albums
Sequel albums